In geometry, the Murakami–Yano formula, introduced by , is a formula for the volume of a hyperbolic or spherical tetrahedron given in terms of its dihedral angles.

References
 url=http://www.f.waseda.jp/murakami/papers/tetrahedronrev4.pdf

Theorems in geometry